The Sternophoridae are a family of pseudoscorpions with about 20 described species in three genera. While Afrosternophorus is an Old World genus, found mainly in Australasia (with, despite its name, only one African species), the other two genera are found in the New World, from El Salvador to the southern USA and in the Dominican Republic.

Species
 Afrosternophorus Beier, 1967
 Afrosternophorus aethiopicus Beier, 1967 — Ethiopia
 Afrosternophorus anabates Harvey, 1985 — Australia
 Afrosternophorus araucariae Beier, 1971 — New Guinea
 Afrosternophorus cavernae Beier, 1982 — New Guinea
 Afrosternophorus ceylonicus Beier, 1973 — India, Sri Lanka
 Afrosternophorus chamberlini Redikorzev, 1938 — Laos, Vietnam
 Afrosternophorus cylindrimanus Beier, 1951 — Laos
 Afrosternophorus dawydoffi Beier, 1951 — Cambodia, Vietnam
 Afrosternophorus fallax Harvey, 1985 — Vietnam
 Afrosternophorus grayi Beier, 1971 — New Guinea
 Afrosternophorus hirsti J.C. Chamberlin, 1932 — Australia
 Afrosternophorus nanus Harvey, 1985 — Australia
 Afrosternophorus papuanus Beier, 1975 — New Guinea
 Afrosternophorus xalyx Harvey, 1985 — Australia

 Garyops Banks, 1909
 Garyops centralis Beier, 1953 — El Salvador
 Garyops depressus Banks, 1909 — Florida, Dominican Republic
 Garyops ferrisi J.C. Chamberlin, 1932 — Mexico
 Garyops sini J.C. Chamberlin, 1923 — Mexico

 Idiogaryops Hoff, 1963
 Idiogaryops paludis J.C. Chamberlin, 1932 — southeastern United States
 Idiogaryops pumilus <small>Hoff, 1963 — Florida

References
 Joel Hallan's Biology Catalog: Sternophoridae

 
Pseudoscorpion families